HMS Jupiter was a J-class destroyer of the Royal Navy.

Design
As completed, Jupiter had a main gun armament of six  QF Mark XII guns in three twin mountings, two forward and one aft. These guns could only elevate to an angle of 40 degrees, and so were of limited use in the anti-aircraft role, while the aft mount was arranged so that it could fire forwards over the ship's superstructure to maximise the forward firing firepower, but was therefore incapable of firing directly aft. A short range anti-aircraft armament of a four-barrelled 2 pounder "pom-pom" anti-aircraft mount and eight .50 in machine guns in two quadruple mounts was fitted, while torpedo armament consisted of ten  torpedo tubes in two quintuple mounts.

Construction and career

Jupiter was ordered, along with the rest of the J class, on 25 March 1937, and was laid down by Yarrow, Limited, at their Scotstoun, Glasgow shipyard on Clydebank in Scotland on 28 September 1937 and launched on 27 October 1938. She was commissioned on 22 June 1939, and was completed on 25 June 1939, at a cost of £389,511.

After commissioning, Jupiter underwent sea trials and worked up at Portland, with these activities being delayed by problems with the ship's turbines that required repair at Devonport Dockyard. Jupiter completed trials on 1 September 1939, and joined the 7th Destroyer Flotilla of the Home Fleet, based on the Humber, in time for the British declaration of war on 3 September 1939.

On 29 November 1941, Jupiter and the destroyer  detached from the Mediterranean Fleet, joined up with Force G at Colombo, and the five ships sailed later that day. They rendezvoused with the battlecruiser  at sea, and set course for Singapore, where they arrived on 2 December. They spent a few days there with shore leave and refit, while waiting for orders. On 1 December, it was announced that Sir Tom Phillips had been promoted to full Admiral, and appointed Commander-in-Chief of the Eastern Fleet. A few days later, Repulse started on a trip to Australia with the destroyers Vampire and Tenedos, but the force was recalled. It was not until nine days later that Tenedos and Repulse would join Phillips' Force Z in attacking the Japanese invasion force, and he himself would perish when both Repulse and the battleship Prince of Wales were bombed and sunk by Japanese land based bombers. During her campaign in the Pacific, Jupiter was commanded by Lieutenant Commander Norman V. J. T. Thew.

On 27 February 1942 she struck a mine laid earlier in the day by the Dutch minelayer  as she steamed with the American-British-Dutch-Australian Command (ABDA) cruiser force during the Battle of the Java Sea. The destroyer sank off the north Java coast in the Java Sea at 21:16 hours. Initially, the explosion was thought to have been caused by a Japanese torpedo.

The wreck has been plotted, and is described by the Admiralty as "very broken up, partly salvaged, and very close to the Java coast".

Notes

Footnotes

References

External links
 Pacific Wrecks:  HMS Jupiter (F85)
 HMS Jupiter Association

 

J, K and N-class destroyers of the Royal Navy
Ships built on the River Clyde
1938 ships
World War II destroyers of the United Kingdom
World War II shipwrecks in the Java Sea
Ships sunk by mines
Maritime incidents in February 1942